Plumbagella is a monotypic genus of flowering plants belonging to the family Plumbaginaceae. The only species is Plumbagella micrantha.

Its native range is Central Asia to Siberia and Western and Northern China.

References

Plumbaginaceae
Monotypic Caryophyllales genera